The Matecaña City Zoo (Zoológico Matecaña) is a zoo located in Pereira, Colombia.

The zoo has a collection of 800 individuals from 150 different species, including birds, mammals and snakes from the Americas, Africa and Asia, as well as endemic species. The design allows the surroundings of each species to closely mimic their natural habitat. The botanic gardens also have diverse native and non-native flora.

History 
The original purpose had been to build a  football stadium, but the ground was not considered suitable.

In 1959 the first secure cages were built to lock the few captive animals, the project was made official and the purchase of animals was authorized. In 1961 was the chronological accuracy of its foundation and opened an item in the budget for food, maintenance and management of animals like condors (Andean Condor), Bengal tigers (Panthera tigris tigris), eagles and the Colombian Atlantic coast flamingos. In 1968 the park was visited by dignitaries from Mexico and made contact with the Chapultepec Zoo. The animals purchased were an Asian elephant, a zebra (male), two hippos, sacred baboons (Papio hamadryas) and sable antelopes. expanding the collection.

The collection was maintained until 1993 when exotic African fauna arrived from Hacienda Napoles (Pablo Escobar's country house). In 1999 the education department was established to coordinate environmental education programs for the conservation of biodiversity in Colombia and spread the importance of all species of wild fauna and flora.

Matecaña zoo sites 
 Serpent
 Clinic
 Step Home
 Bird place (aviary)
 Museum of Natural Sciences
 Lake
 Education Department (Zoo Guides)

References 
 http://zoopereira20.galeon.com/

External links 
 

Pereira, Colombia
Zoos in Colombia
Buildings and structures in Risaralda Department
Tourist attractions in Risaralda Department
Zoos established in 1959
1959 establishments in Colombia